Sarah Collings is a female English and British former competitive swimmer and six times British champion.

Swimming career
Collings made her senior international debut at 1997 European Aquatics Championships in Seville. where she finished in 7th.

Collings represented England and won a bronze medal in the 800 metres freestyle event, at the 1998 Commonwealth Games in Kuala Lumpur, Malaysia.

She is a four times champion of the ASA National Championship over 800 metres freestyle in 1994, 1996, 1998 and 1999. She is also a one time winner of the 200 metres title and the 400 metres title in 1996.

Sarah represented Great Britain at the European Short Course Swimming Championships in 1996, 1998 and 1999 and won bronze medals in 1996 and 1998. She also represented Great Britain at the World Short Course Championships in 1997 and 1999, finishing in the Top 8 both times.

At Masters level in 2016 Sarah swam in the European Masters Swimming Championships in London and became champion in the 35 - 39 age group at both the 400m and 800m Freestyle, and won Silver in the 200m in a British Record time.

Personal life
She was educated at the University of Bath achieving BA (Hons) in Coach Education. She followed this up with a PG Cert in Coaching Science from the University of West England and has since graduated from Manchester Metropolitan University with a MSD in Sporting Directorship.  Currently she is the Director of Sport at the Griffin Schools Trust.

References

Living people
1978 births
English female swimmers
Swimmers at the 1998 Commonwealth Games
Commonwealth Games bronze medallists for England
Commonwealth Games medallists in swimming
Medallists at the 1998 Commonwealth Games